Wiener Neudorf (Central Bavarian: Weana Neiduaf) is an Austrian town in the eastern part of the Mödling district, south of Vösendorf and Maria Enzersdorf, west of Biedermannsdorf, and north of Guntramsdorf.

History 
First settled in 4000 B.C., the first mention of Wiener Neudorf was as Nowendorf in the mid-12th century.  In 1270 a paper mentioned tolls for traveling from Sollenau and Neudorf.  Circa 1500 the 'Feste Neudorf' fortification was destroyed twice by invading Turks.  In 1854, Wiener Neudorf became the official name, which stemmed from the postal system development in the early 19th century (Wiener Neudorf gained the letter 'W' to differentiate the name).

Wiener Neudorf industrialisation began in the mid-19th century especially due to the available clay used by the Neudorfer Ziegelwerke of Wienerberger.  The Austria Brauerei major brewery was located in Wiener Neudorf as well.  By 1900 the telephone network was unified with the neighbouring municipalities and the sewage system had been extended.

Nazi Germany After the 1938 Anschluss, Wiener Neudorf became part of the 24th municipality of Vienna.  Circa 1940 construction of the Flugmotorenwerke Ostmark aircraft engine factory was started at Wiener Neudorf, and forced labor was provided by a subcamp of Mauthausen concentration camp.  Allied attacks included the August 23, 1944 raid which bombed the South industrial area of Vienna, including the Wiener Neudorf aircraft engine factory, the Vösendorf oil refinery, and Markersdorf Airfield.  An earlier bombing was on July 26, 1944. On April 6, 1945, the town fell into Russian hands.

Mödling was returned to Lower Austria in 1954.

Population

Politics 
By seats in the municipal council. Total 33.

Traffic 
Wiener Neudorf lies directly at the B-17 'Wiener Neudstädter Strasse', a major traffic route.
Due to the proximity of the Shopping City Süd, the road experiences frequent traffic jams.
Also close to the town lies the A2 'Südautobahn'.

Economy 
Wiener Neudorf is home to the 'Industriezentrum NÖ Süd', a conglomerate of various industries and major economy factor in the south of Vienna.

Culture and Sights 

 Altes Rathaus (lit. 'Old town hall') - now a cultural center in Wiener Neudorf.
Maria Schnee church 
Christoph Migazzi house - another cultural center

References

 'Kurt Janetschek - Wiener Neudorf im Wandel der Zeit, 1978'

External links 
 
 

Cities and towns in Mödling District
Mauthausen concentration camp